Steve Molnar (February 28, 1947 – January 16, 2021) was a Canadian Football League running back.

Molnar played in the 1972 and 1976 Grey Cups for the Saskatchewan Roughriders.

Statistics
When Molnar played for the Saskatchewan Roughriders he scored in the 1975 Western Conference final 3 touchdowns, 1 two point convert, 0 field goals, 0 safeties, for a total of 20 points.

Notes and references

1947 births
2021 deaths
Canadian football running backs
Players of Canadian football from Saskatchewan
Saskatchewan Roughriders players
Utah Utes football players